"Love Keeps Calling" is the third single released by the Belgian act AnnaGrace, following their 2008 debut single "You Make Me Feel" and 2009 second single "Let the Feelings Go", both of which reached number No.1 on the U.S. Billboard Hot Dance Airplay chart. The song was released in Belgium by Sinuz Recordings and in the United States by Robbins Entertainment. The single also gave the act the distinction of becoming the first act to have reached number one three consecutive times on Billboard's Hot Dance Airplay chart, all this without an album or CD release.

Track listing
CD Maxi-Single
 "Love Keeps Calling" (Radio Edit) – 3:31
 "Love Keeps Calling" (Extended) – 5:44
 "Love Keeps Calling" (Basto! Impression) – 7:02
 "Love Keeps Calling" (Lucky Charmes & Tony Verdult Remix) – 6:23

Release history

Chart performance

Weekly charts

Year-end charts

References

2009 songs
2009 singles
AnnaGrace songs
Songs written by Peter Luts
Songs written by Annemie Coenen